Rohit Bakshi may refer to:

 Rohit Bakshi (neurologist), American neurologist
 Rohit Bakshi (actor), Indian actor
 Rohit Bakshi (entrepreneur), Indian entrepreneur and former 3x3 professional basketball player

See also 
 Bakshi, a surname